Thryptomene is a genus of flowering plants in the family Myrtaceae and is endemic to Australia. Plants in the genus Thryptomene are shrubs with small leaves arranged in opposite pairs and white or pink flowers. About forty-seven species of Thryptomene, occurring in all Australian states and the Northern Territory, have been formally described.

Description
The flowers are usually arranged singly or in pairs in leaf axils, and usually have five sepals, five white or pink petals and five, rarely ten or fifteen stamens. The fruit is a nut usually containing a single seed.

Taxonomy
The genus Thryptomene was first formally described in 1838 by Stephan Ladislaus Endlicher in Stirpium Australasicarum Herbarii Hugeliani Decades Tres, published in the journal Annalen des Wiener Museums der Naturgeschichte and the first species described was Thryptomene australis. The name Thryptomene means "made small".

Species list
The following is a list of Thrypomene species accepted by the Australian Plant Census as of April 2021:

Use in horticulture
Thryptomene saxicola has been cultivated for many years as a hardy garden plant and along with T. calycina is popular in the cut-flower trade.

References

 
Endemic flora of Australia
Myrtaceae genera
Myrtales of Australia
Taxa named by Stephan Endlicher